Monogrenade is a francophone band based in Montreal, Quebec, Canada.

History
After releasing their first EP in 2009, entitled La saveur des fruits on Paper Bag Records, they came in second place at the 2010 edition of Les Francouvertes.

The band gained attention when the video for their song Ce soir was featured on Mashable's list of Top 10 Stop-Motion Videos on Youtube.

In 2011, they released their first full-length album Tantale on Bonsound Records. Their second album, Composite, followed in 2014.

Band members
Jean-Michel Pigeon (lyrics, vocals, guitar and keyboards)
François Lessard (bass, guitar)
Marianne Houle (cello)
Mathieu Collette (drums)

Discography
 La saveur des fruits (2009, Paper Bag Records)
 Tantale (2011, Bonsound Records)
 Composite (2014)

References

Musical groups established in 2008
Musical groups from Montreal
Canadian indie rock groups
2008 establishments in Quebec